This is the timeline of the Lewis and Clark Expedition through the American West, 1803-1806.

1803

1804

1805

1806

1807

References

Footnotes

Sources

External links
Journals of the Lewis and Clark Expedition Online
Kaw Point Encampment (26–29 June 1804)

 
Lewis and Clark Expedition